Mashda of Kish was the eleventh Sumerian king in the First Dynasty of Kish, according to the Sumerian king list. He was a son of the king Atab. Like the other members of the First dynasty prior to Etana, he was named for an animal; his name "Mashda" is Akkadian for "gazelle". Mashda is unlikely to have existed as his name does not appear on texts dating from the period in which he was presumed to have lived (Early Dynastic period).

References 

|-

Kings of Kish
Sumerian kings